Pantao is the name of several barangays in the Philippines:

Pantao only
 Pantao, Calatrava, Negros Occidental
 Pantao, Libon, Albay
 Pantao, Mabinay, Negros Oriental
 Pantao, Munai, Lanao del Norte
 Pantao, Poona Bayabao, Lanao del Sur
 Pantao, San Jose de Buenavista, Antique
 Pantao, Sibalom, Antique
 Pantao, Talipao, Sulu

With Pantao
 Pangandaman Pantao, Masiu, Lanao del Sur
 Pantao-A-Munai, Munai, Lanao del Norte
 Pantao-Marug, Pantar, Lanao del Norte
 Pantao-Ranao, Pantar, Lanao del Norte
 Pantao Raya, Poona Piagapo, Lanao del Norte
 Pantao Raya, Saguiaran, Lanao del Sur

Pantao may also refer to:
Peaches of Immortality in Chinese mythology